The Riochican age is a period of geologic time (57.0–54.0 Ma) within the Paleocene and Eocene epochs of the Paleogene, used more specifically within the South American land mammal ages (SALMA). It follows the Peligran and precedes the Itaboraian age.

Etymology 
This age is named after the Río Chico Group of the Golfo San Jorge Basin.

Formations

Fossils

References

Bibliography 
Bogotá Formation
 
 
 

Bororó Formation
 

Chota Formation
 
 

Las Flores Formation
 

Koluel Kaike Formation
 

Maíz Gordo Formation
 

Mealla Formation
 

Mogollón Formation
 
 

Muñani Formation
 

Peñas Coloradas Formation
 
 

Río Loro Formation
 

Salamanca Formation
 
 
 
 
 

 
Paleocene South America
Eocene South America
Paleogene Argentina